Col des Roches (el. 919 m.) is a mountain pass in the Jura Mountains on the border between the canton of Neuchâtel in Switzerland and France.

It connects Le Locle in Switzerland and Morteau in France.

It is notable for 16th century subterranean mills located in caves on the Swiss side.

References

Roches
Roches
Roches
Mountain passes of the canton of Neuchâtel
France–Switzerland border crossings
Landforms of Doubs